Spinacleris is a genus of moths belonging to the family Tortricidae. It contains only one species, Spinacleris inthanoni, which is found in Thailand.

The wingspan is 18 mm. The ground colour of the forewings is brownish with indistinct, diffuse dark brown markings consisting of the costal part of the median fascia followed by two spots and terminal suffusion. There is a blackish line along the cubital edge of the median cell accompanied by a short line at the end of the latter. The hindwings are brownish cream, browner terminally.

Etymology 
The genus name is a combination of the name of the genus Acleris and Latin spina (meaning a spine). The species name refers to the type locality.

See also 
 List of Tortricidae genera

References

External links 
 tortricidae.com

Tortricini